Pancho Aréna is a stadium in Felcsút, Hungary. It is used mostly for football matches and is the home stadium of Puskás Akadémia FC. Between 2015 and 2018, the stadium was the home also for the three-time champions Fehérvár FC due to the reconstruction of Sóstói Stadion.

History
The stadium was opened on 21 April 2014 with the final of the 2014 Puskás Cup.

On 26 April 2014, the first Hungarian League match was played at the stadium between Puskás Akadémia and Videoton. The match ended with 3–1 away win.

On 30 June 2016 the first UEFA Europa League will be played between Videoton FC and FC Zaria Bălți at the stadium. Since Videoton's stadium, Sóstói Stadion, was demolished in the spring of 2016, the Székesfehérvár-based club will play their matches at the Pancho Aréna.

The Pancho Aréna was listed among the top three most beautiful stadiums of the world according to stadiumdb.com. "The wood-lined curved interior to the stand gives spectators the feeling that they are attending a Sunday church service, not a football match. The 3,500 seater stadium opened in 2014 and was the brainchild of local architect Imre Makovecz".

On 26 March 2018, the first international match was played at the stadium when Bulgaria hosted Kazakhstan in a friendly match. The match ended with a 2–1 win for Bulgaria.

Controversy
Many allegations of corruption have surfaced regarding the stadium, as Hungary's current prime minister, Viktor Orbán (known for his passion for football) spent much of his childhood in the village, and Pancho Arena was built just meters away from his Felcsút estate. Although the stadium was not built directly from government funds, companies that provided the lion's share of the funding won several high-value public procurement procedures during Orbán's prime ministership. In addition, Orbán's government passed laws granting benefits to companies supporting sport investments. Allegations were fuelled by the fact that the stadium seats 3,500 people, while the total population of the village is under 1,700. From a historical perspective similarities can be found between Pancho Aréna and Stadionul Viitorul.

Milestone matches

Milestone matches (youth squad)

International

Attendances

Puskás Akadémia only played three matches at the Pancho Aréna during the 2013–14 season. This table includes only domestic league matches.

Gallery

References

Football venues in Hungary
2014 establishments in Hungary
Sports venues completed in 2014